This is a list of Billboard magazine's ranking of the year's top country singles of 1964. 

Buck Owens had two of the top three singles with "My Heart Skips a Beat" (No. 1) and "Together Again" (No. 3). Owens had two additional No. 1 hits with "Love's Gonna Live Here" and "I Don't Care (Just as Long as You Love Me)".

Jim Reeves, who died in a plane crash in July 1964, also had two top five singles with "Welcome to My World" (No. 2) and "I Guess I'm Crazy" (No. 4).

See also
List of Hot Country Singles number ones of 1964
List of Billboard Hot 100 number ones of 1964
1964 in country music

Notes

References

1964 record charts
Billboard charts
1964 in American music